Richard Nunez (born March 23, 1961) is an American painter and artist based out of the Dallas–Fort Worth Metroplex in Texas of Mescalero Apache descent.  Nunez paints primarily acrylic on canvas.  He is influenced by Renaissance artists such as Michelangelo and has painted anything of interest but finds "the icons" the most stimulating.

His work has been interpreted as both heavily textured abstract art with a touch of realism and heavily textured realism with a touch of abstract.

Biography
Richard Nunez was born in 1961 in Fort Wayne, Indiana, to Esther and Henry Nunez, both of Apache Indian descent. Nunez's parents did not tell Richard about his heritage because they did not want him to have to endure prejudices aimed at Native Americans. He says he did not find out about his heritage until 2004.

Nunez attended Southside High School in Fort Wayne, graduating in 1979.  He says he started drawing artistic influence that would decades later be found in his work from the highly stylized comic books of this era.  His early sketches show this influence.  During high school, Nunez worked at WMEE radio station from 1978 to 1979 as a maintenance engineer when that station was switching from AM to FM frequency.

In 1979, Nunez married his first wife and daughter Erica Lynn was born in 1981.  His second child, Ryan Nathaniel, was born in 1985.

At the urging of his wife, Nunez left the radio station but was not yet ready to become a full-time, professional artist.  He would spend the next 20 years working in various capacities but always with art as his passion.  Nunez worked such jobs ranging from a dishwasher in a Mexican restaurant, grocery store bagger, salesman at Home Depot and Montgomery Wards, forklift operator, bartender, standup comic and singer.  He was briefly married for a 2nd time.

In 1993, after two failed marriages and a desire to become an artist, Nunez decided to move to Phoenix, Arizona. to find his path in life.  During the trip from Indiana to Arizona, Nunez passed through Dallas when his car broke down.  Without the funds to pay for repairs, Nunez was taken in by an uncle and never left.

Nunez then spent the next 13 years working in the hospitality industry as a bartender, waiter and head trainer for several high-volume establishments.  He eventually became the general manager for a wine bar in Highland Village, TX, 30 minutes outside of Dallas. The wine bar gave hime a venue where he could showcase his pieces by painting live in front of the evening's guests.  He knew that he could increase his art's visibility by making the wine bar more successful.

Finally, in 2005, at the age of 45, Nunez was ready to pursue art full-time.  He says his birthday that year made him realize he was in a now-or-never situation to chase his dream of becoming a working artist.  It was also at this time that he met his current wife, Nancy Nunez, whom Nunez cites as his muse and has since become the art director of Nunez's NINA Art, the company he founded to showcase his work.  NINA Art draws its name from Nunez's nickname for Nancy.

Charitable work
Through Nunez Art Director's inspiration, Nunez decided early on that his life's work would be supporting women and children. His goal with NINA Art is to use his talent to put him in a place with celebrities and athletes where they can work together to raise money for worthy causes and charities.

Nunez estimates that through NINA Art, in excess of $350,000 has been raised from 2006-2013 for various causes. One of Nunez's pieces sold for $21,000 at a fundraiser, the current highest amount for one of his pieces.

Charities that have partnered with Nunez include Cystic Fibrosis Foundation, Cattle Barons Ball, American Diabetes Association, Arts for Andy, Top Hats (Humane Society), Children’s Advocacy Center of Denton County, Frisco Family Services, Friends of the Family, American Cancer Society, Frisco Chamber of Commerce Scholarship Fund, Tony Stewart Foundation, Boys and Girls Clubs of America, Children’s Speedway and Wednesday's Child.

Nunez often works with various local, national and international celebrities to raise money for either their personal charity or a third-party charity. These celebrities include Dan Aykroyd, James Belushi, Bill Cosby, Vince Gill, the Gipsy Kings, Buddy Guy, Tom Jones, B. B. King, Tony Orlando, Livingston Taylor (brother of singer James Taylor), Adam Sandler, Jeff Bridges, George H. W. Bush, George W. Bush, and Rod Stewart.
 
Athletes Nunez has worked with include Tashard Choice, Tony Dorsett, Walt Garrison, Michael Irvin, Preston Pearson, Tony Romo, Deion Sanders, Roger Staubach, DeMarcus Ware, Randy White (American football) and Rayfield Wright, all of the Dallas Cowboys; the NFL's Quan Cosby; Jason Kidd, Dirk Nowitzki and Jason Terry of the Dallas Mavericks; Moses Malone and Spud Webb from the NBA; Nancy Lieberman of the WNBA; Olympians Michael Johnson (athlete) and Nastia Liukin; and NASCAR's Tony Stewart.

Nunez’s personal favorite charities are Women Called Moses, Society of Women Who Love Shoes and Children’s Advocacy Center of Denton County. When Nunez is not traveling he paints live, every week, at III Forks in Dallas.  Nunez recently opened up Studio Nunez located in Dallas. More details to follow.

References

External links

 

1961 births
Living people
American people of Apache descent
20th-century American painters
Artists from Fort Wayne, Indiana
People from Denton County, Texas
21st-century American painters